These are the results of the 2014 IAAF Continental Cup, which took place in Marrakech, Morocco on 13–14 September 2014.

Men

Track

Men's 100 metres
13 SeptemberWind: -0.1 m/s

Men's 200 metres
14 SeptemberWind: +0.2 m/s

Men's 400 metres
13 September

Men's 800 metres
14 September

Men's 1500 metres
13 September

Men's 3000 metres
14 September

Men's 5000 metres
13 September

Men's 110 metres hurdles
14 SeptemberWind: +0.1 m/s

Men's 400 metres hurdles
13 September

Men's 3000 metres steeplechase
14 September

Men's 4 × 100 metres relay
13 September

Men's 4 × 400 metres relay
14 September

Field

Men's high jump
13 September

Men's pole vault
14 September

Men's long jump
13 September

Men's triple jump
14 September

Men's shot put
13 September

Men's discus throw
14 September

Men's hammer throw
13 September

Men's javelin throw
14 September

Women

Track

Women's 100 metres
13 SeptemberWind: -1.5 m/s

Women's 200 metres
14 SeptemberWind: +0.3 m/s

Women's 400 metres
13 September

Women's 800 metres
13 September

Women's 1500 metres
14 September

Women's 3000 metres
13 September

Women's 5000 metres
14 September

Women's 100 metres hurdles
14 SeptemberWind: +0.7 m/s

Women's 400 metres hurdles
13 September

Women's 3000 metres steeplechase
14 September

Women's 4 × 100 metres relay
13 September

Women's 4 × 400 metres relay
14 September

Field

Women's high jump
14 September

Women's pole vault
13 September

Women's long jump
14 September

Women's triple jump
13 September

Women's shot put
14 September

Women's discus throw
14 September

Women's hammer throw
14 September

Women's javelin throw
13 September

References

IAAF World Cup results
Events at the IAAF Continental Cups